"Take Me Back to London" is a song by British singer-songwriter Ed Sheeran featuring British rapper Stormzy. It was released through Asylum and Atlantic Records as the final single from the former's compilation album No.6 Collaborations Project (2019). 

The song was written by Sheeran, Shellback, Karl Sandberg, Frederik Gibson and Michael Omari Jr., with production from Skrillex, Kenny Beats and Fred. The song reached number one on the UK Singles Chart following the release of its remix.

Background and composition
Sheeran and Stormzy previously performed together at the 2017 Brit Awards. "Take Me Back to London" was announced as part of the tracklist for No.6 Collaborations Project (2019).

"Take Me Back to London" is a grime song. According to HotNewHipHop'''s Aron A., Sheeran "shows off his bars on the record while swapping verses with Stormzy". The song sees Sheeran "brag" about the gross of his ÷ Tour.

Critical receptionTimes Raisa Bruner wrote that the trap beat on "Take Me Back to London" gets "Sheeran’s melodic touch, with Stormzy jumping in from the start to boost the energy with his signature vibrancy". Jon Caramanica of The New York Times wrote that Stormzy "does an admirable job of rapping ferociously but politely enough to not upstage the host", criticising the line "It’s that time, big Mike and Teddy are on grime".

Commercial performance
"Take Me Back to London" achieved success in the United Kingdom, where it debuted at number three and later reached number one on the UK Singles Chart, becoming the third single from No.6 Collaborations Project to reach the summit of the chart. It was Sheeran's eighth and Stormzy's second number one in the UK.

 Charts 

Weekly charts

Year-end charts

Certifications

Release history

Remix

"Take Me Back to London (Sir Spyro Remix)'''", featuring English rappers Stormzy, Jaykae and Aitch was released as a single on 23 August 2019.

Music video 
A music video for the Sir Spyro remix was shot between Manchester, Birmingham and London by director KC Locke. It opens with images of Sheeran and Stormzy ripping up the countryside in a Rolls-Royce Cullinan while wearing matching tracksuits and getting measured for bespoke suits. They're soon joined by Jaykae and Aitch to watch some motorcycle burnouts and along the way there is plenty of quintessentially British activity, including a spot of tea, late night post-pub grubbing and copious pints chugged.

Track listing

Release history

References 

2019 songs
2019 singles
Ed Sheeran songs
Asylum Records singles
Atlantic Records singles
Song recordings produced by Fred Again
Song recordings produced by Kenny Beats
Song recordings produced by Skrillex
Songs written by Ed Sheeran
Songs written by Fred Again
Songs written by Max Martin
Songs written by Shellback (record producer)
Songs written by Stormzy
Stormzy songs
UK Singles Chart number-one singles
Songs about London